Estranged is a 2006, 20-minute short film directed by D. J. Matrundola. The film is about a character named Chloe who is forced to reunite with her estranged brother, Julian, and drive down to their mother's hometown. Julian shows up with a precocious twelve-year-old girl named Suzy, unwanted by her divorcing parents and hitching a ride to her aunt's house.

Cast
Freya Ravensbergen as Chloe
Éléonore Lamothe as Suzy
Paul Burke as Julian

Critical reception
"Estranged is only 20 minutes yet it packs a lot of punch". --Ryan Cracknell, Movie Views
"Estranged is an entertaining dysfunctional family short, with talent behind every inch of film". --Felix Vasquez Jr., Cinema Crazed

Festivals
The Australian International Film Festival (Official Selection)
Secret City Film Festival  (Official Selection)
Fylmz Festival (Official Selection)
Anchorage Film Festival (Official Selection)
DNA Film Festival (Official Selection)
Victoria Film Festival (Official Selection)

References

External links
 IMDB page
 Official Website
Helena inc.
Glenn Hodgins
Cindy Brace.com 

2006 short films
2006 films
Canadian drama short films
2000s English-language films
2000s Canadian films